Petrovirivka is a village in Berezivka Raion, Odesa Oblast, Ukraine. It hosts the administration of Petrovirivka rural hromada, one of the hromadas of Ukraine. 

Petrovirivka was founded as Petroverovka (Петроверовка) in 1814, and was then part of Tiraspolsky Uyezd, Kherson Governorate in the Russian Empire. It was named Zhovten from 1927 to 2016.

Until 18 July 2020, Petrovirivka belonged to Shyriaieve Raion. The raion was abolished in July 2020 as part of the administrative reform of Ukraine, which reduced the number of raions of Odesa Oblast to seven. The area of Shyriaieve Raion was merged into Berezivka Raion.

Population of Petrovirivka is 2,954.

Notable natives
Teodor Oizerman, Soviet philosopher

References

Villages in Berezivka Raion
Tiraspolsky Uyezd